The list of ship commissionings in 1926 includes a chronological list of all ships commissioned in 1926.



Sources 
http://www.netherlandsnavy.nl/Javacl.html
http://www.netherlandsnavy.nl/Flores.htm
https://web.archive.org/web/20131005094320/http://www.dutchsubmarines.com/classes/class_kxi.htm
http://www.dutchsubmarines.com/classes/class_o9.htm

1926